Laughlin Air Force Base  is a facility of the United States Air Force located east of Del Rio, Texas.

Overview
Laughlin AFB, the largest pilot training base in the US Air Force, is home to the 47th Flying Training Wing of the Air Education and Training Command and the 96th Flying Training Squadron of the Air Force Reserve Command. On weekdays, the airfield sees more takeoffs and landings than any other airport in the country.

History

Laughlin Army Air Field 
Laughlin AFB was originally named Laughlin Army Air Field on March 3, 1943, after Jack T. Laughlin, a B-17E Flying Fortress pilot. He was trained as a pilot and was actually co-pilot of B-17E, tail number 41-2476.  On the day of his first bombing mission, he was bumped by the Group Commander Major Stanley K. Robinson (Robinson was co-pilot next to pilot Capt. Walter W. Sparks).  Major Robinson brought along his own combat-experienced navigator, Lt. Richard Cease.  Laughlin had no assigned position on the plane for the mission.  He became Del Rio's first World War II casualty when the plane he was flying in (most likely as a waist gunner for the mission) was lost at sea, having succumbed to damage received over the Makassar Strait on 29 (or 28) January 1942.  The damage occurred during two bombing runs against Japanese warships and transports in the Makassar Strait off the coast of Balikpapan, Borneo.  The field became simply Laughlin Field on November 11, 1943, and later an U.S. Army Air Forces Auxiliary Field. During World War II, Laughlin's primary mission was the training of B-26 Marauder pilots and aircrews. It was closed in October 1945.

Laughlin Air Force Base 
Laughlin Air Force Base reopened on May 1, 1952. In October 1952, ATC transferred the base to Crew Training Air Force (CREWTAF) and activated the 3645th Flying Training Wing (Fighter), as a combat crew replacement training facility for pilots headed for Korea. Training provided new pilots with basic bombing and gunnery combat skills in the F-80 Shooting Star, F-84 Thunderjet, and T-33 jet aircraft, but within short time crews used only the T-33. In September 1955, Laughlin came under the control of the Flying Training Air Force and switched missions with Williams Air Force Base, Arizona. Laughlin undertook single-engine pilot training, still using the T-33.

Strategic Air Command 
The U.S. Air Force transferred jurisdiction of the base to the Strategic Air Command on April 1, 1957, and the 4080th Strategic Reconnaissance Wing (Light) moved there from Turner Air Force Base, Georgia. Following the graduation of the last class in March 1957, ATC inactivated the 3645th FTW. The 4080th Wing provided high-altitude reconnaissance and air sampling using the Lockheed U-2A and the RB-57D Canberra. The 4080th Strategic Reconnaissance Wing was redesignated as the 4080th Strategic Wing on June 15, 1960, and the RB-57 mission was phased out.

Laughlin U-2s were among the first to provide photographic evidence of Soviet missile installations in Cuba in 1962 when 4080th U-2 pilot major Steve Heyser flew his U-2C over Cuba after taking off from Edwards AFB, California. Heyser landed at McCoy AFB, Florida, following the mission, with McCoy becoming a U-2 operating location for the duration of the Cuban Missile Crisis. The film from Major Heyser's mission was developed, analyzed and the photos were shown to the United Nations Security Council on October 22, 1962, proving to the world, that offensive missiles were on the island of Cuba.
Another 4080th pilot, Major Rudolf Anderson, Jr., perished when his U-2 was hit by shrapnel from a Soviet-made SA-2 surface-to-air missile on October 22, 1962, while overflying Cuba from McCoy AFB. While the U-2 did not suffer a direct hit, Anderson was struck by fragments from the proximity fused warhead's explosion which penetrated and compromised his pressure suit (at altitude, unconsciousness and death came very quickly). His body was returned to the U.S. following the crisis, still clad in its pressure suit.  Major Anderson posthumously became the first recipient of the Air Force Cross.  Laughlin's primary operations training complex, Anderson Hall, is named in his honor.

Air Training Command 
In 1961, Headquarters U.S. Air Force notified Laughlin officials their mission would expand to again include an Air Training Command undergraduate pilot training program. Plans called to transfer in about half the student load from Laredo Air Force Base, Texas. ATC reactivated the 3645th Pilot Training Wing (later redesignated 3646th Pilot Training Wing) at Laughlin in October 1961 to prepare for the phase-in of students and T-37 and T-33 trainers. The 4080th SW continued at Laughlin as a tenant organization until 1963.

Today, aircraft flown at Laughlin include the T-6A Texan II, the T-38C Talon and T-1A Jayhawk. Fifteen classes of approximately 20–25 pilots graduate annually.

Based units 
Flying and notable non-flying units based at Laughlin Air Force Base:

United States Air Force 
Air Education and Training Command (AETC)
 47th Flying Training Wing
 47th Comptroller Squadron
 47th Operations Group
 47th Operations Support Squadron
 47th Student Squadron
 85th Flying Training Squadron – T-6A Texan II
 86th Flying Training Squadron – T-1A Jayhawk
 87th Flying Training Squadron – T-38C Talon
 434th Flying Training Squadron – T-6A Texan II
 47th Medical Group
 47th Medical Operations Squadron
 47th Medical Support Squadron
 47th Mission Support Group
 47th Communications Squadron
 47th Contracting Flight
 47th Civil Engineering Squadron
 47th Force Support Squadron
 47th Logistics Readiness Flight
 47th Security Forces Squadron

Air Force Reserve Command
 Tenth Air Force
 340th Flying Training Group
 96th Flying Training Squadron (GSU) – T-1A Jayhawk, T-6A Texan II, T-38C Talon (GSU are Geographically Separate Units, which although based at Laughlin, are subordinate to a parent unit based at another location.)

Geography
According to the United States Census Bureau, the base has a total area of 5.9 square miles (15.3 km2), all of it land.

Demographics
The U.S. Census Bureau counts the base as a census-designated place (Laughlin AFB CDP) with a population at the 2020 census of 1,673.

Education
Laughlin AFB is served by the San Felipe Del Rio Consolidated Independent School District. The school district operates an elementary school inside Laughlin AFB, the Roberto Barrera STEM Elementary school (K–5) (formerly known as Laughlin STEM elementary school).

Park University offers onsite and online classes on base. Its office is located at the Education Center and is open to military and civilian personnel.

See also

 List of United States Air Force installations
 Texas World War II Army Airfields

References

 Manning, Thomas A. (2005), History of Air Education and Training Command, 1942–2002.  Office of History and Research, Headquarters, AETC, Randolph AFB, Texas 
 Shaw, Frederick J. (2004), Locating Air Force Base Sites, History’s Legacy, Air Force History and Museums Program, United States Air Force, Washington DC.

External links

 

 

1942 establishments in Texas
Census-designated places in Texas
Installations of the United States Air Force in Texas
Buildings and structures in Val Verde County, Texas
Airfields of the United States Army Air Forces in Texas
Military airbases established in 1952
Military installations in Texas